Sir Robert Andrew Raymond Syms (born 15 August 1956) is a Conservative Party politician in the United Kingdom.  He has been the Member of Parliament (MP) for Poole in Dorset since 1997. He was granted a knighthood in 2017.

Early life
Syms was born in Chippenham, Wiltshire, in 1956 and educated at Colston's School, Bristol. He was leader of North Wiltshire District Council from 1984 to 1987 and a Wiltshire County Councillor from 1985 to 1997. He was managing director of his family's plant hire firm on Bristol Road in Chippenham, and is a Fellow of the Chartered Institute of Building.

Business interests
He retains a directorship and shareholding in Marden Holdings Ltd, headquartered in Bristol Road, Chippenham.

Parliamentary career
He contested Walsall North in 1992, but was first elected to the House of Commons as MP for Poole in the 1997 general election.

Syms served on the opposition front bench from 1998 to 2007. He was shadow spokesman for environment, transport and the regions between 1999 and 2001, an opposition whip for a few months in 2003, and shadow minister in the office of the deputy Prime Minister and for communities and local government between 2003 and 2007. He was also vice-Chairman of the Conservative Party between 2001 and 2002.

In May 2009, The Daily Telegraph reported that Syms had claimed more than £2,000 of furniture for his designated second home in London which was delivered to his parents' address in Wiltshire. Syms denied any wrongdoing, telling the Bournemouth Echo: "It was purely a matter of convenience from my point of view." Syms said the furniture was only delivered and assembled at his parents' home, then later transported to his London address.

Syms was an assistant whip for the Coalition government between 2012 and 2013. He has served on a variety of select committees, acting as chair of the Regulatory Reform Committee from July 2010 to September 2012 and the High Speed Rail select committee from April 2014 to February 2016.

Syms organised a letter signed by more than 80 fellow Eurosceptic Conservative MPs urging David Cameron to continue as Prime Minister regardless of the result of the EU referendum in 2016. He backed Theresa May's leadership bid following Cameron's resignation, and was appointed as a Government Whip and Lord Commissioner of HM Treasury upon May's succession.

In 2017, Syms was criticised for name calling on Twitter. He replied to a tweet calling the Conservative-DUP deal after the 2017 general election a "coalition", by calling the twitter user a "dick". Four years earlier, his wife announced on Twitter that he had been dismissed from his job as a whip over the phone.

In 2020, Syms became a "lockdown rebel" and a steering committee member of the lockdown-sceptic COVID Recovery Group alongside a group of Conservative MPs who opposed the UK government's December 2020 lockdown. They have been seen as an "echo" of the Brexiteer European Research Group (ERG) of MPs, and a response by backbench Conservatives to Nigel Farage's anti-lockdown Reform UK party.

Honours 
Syms was appointed Knight Bachelor in October 2017.

Personal life
He is divorced and has two teenage children.

See also
1989 Wiltshire County Council election
1993 Wiltshire County Council election

References

External links 

 Poole Conservatives

1956 births
Living people
Knights Bachelor
Conservative Party (UK) MPs for English constituencies
Members of Wiltshire County Council
Conservative Party (UK) councillors
Politicians awarded knighthoods
Politics of Dorset
Councillors in South West England
UK MPs 1997–2001
UK MPs 2001–2005
UK MPs 2005–2010
UK MPs 2010–2015
UK MPs 2015–2017
UK MPs 2017–2019
UK MPs 2019–present
People from Chippenham
People educated at Colston's School
Leaders of local authorities of England